Common digital arteries may refer to:

 Common palmar digital arteries
 Common plantar digital arteries